Caeoma is a genus of rust fungi.

References

External links 
 

 
 Caeoma at Mycobank

Basidiomycota genera
Pucciniales